Seng Saekhu (born c. 1840s) or Khu Chun Seng or Nguanseng Saekhu was a tax farmer and the patriarch of the Shinawatra clan.

Life
Seng was born in Fengshun, Meizhou, Guangdong to Chao Saekhu. Seng came to Siam in the 1860s together with his parents and second brother. However, as Seng's mother and second brother soon fell ill shortly arriving in Siam, his parents and brother returned to China, leaving Seng in the care of a local acquaintance. Seng spent his early years in Chanthaburi where he met his wife, a native Thai by the name of Thongdi. Their eldest son, Chiang was born in 1890 around this time and Seng started his career as a tax farmer in this small town. When the land lease expired in 1900, Seng and his family moved to Talat Noi in Bangkok around 1900 where worked as a commercial trader. Seng and his family relocated to Chiang Mai around 1908 to resume his career as a tax farmer under the patronage of Nikhon Jinkit.

Family

Seng married two wives; the first to Thongdi with whom he had 6 children, including Chiang. Thongdi died of a heart attack in 1910 due to a robbery incident, and Seng remarried another lady, Nocha with whom he had 3 children. Chiang married another Thai lady, Saeng Samana with whom they have 12 children. Chiang's second child and oldest son, Sak Shinawatra, adopted the Shinawatra surname in 1938, during Plaek Pibulsonggram's anti-Chinese campaigns, and the rest of the clan followed suit. Sak Shinawatra became an army general and has four sons who all served in the army for at least sometime. Sak's third son, Chaiyasit Shinawatra became the commander-in-chief of the Royal Thai Army.

Chiang's 4th child and second son, Loet Shinawatra is the father of Prime Ministers Thaksin Shinawatra and Yingluck Shinawatra. Loet served as an MP for Chiang Mai in 1969 and 1976 for the Thai Nation Party. Loet married Yindi Ramingwong, who is the daughter of a Hakka Chinese immigrant and his wife, a princess of the Lanna royalty.

References

Bibliography

External links
 Thai PM reviled by protesters, but a hero in his home town 
 Thai PM reviled by protesters, but a hero in his home town 
  他信祖籍地：丰顺县塔下村(组图)

Seng Saekhu
Seng Saekhu
People from Fengshun
Seng Saekhu
Seng Saekhu
Businesspeople from Meizhou
1840s births
Year of death missing
Seng Saekhu